The 2019 The Dubai International Cup was the 4th edition of The Dubai International Cup, a friendly association football tournament played in the United Arab Emirates.

Teams

Group stage

Matches

References

External links

January 2019 sports events in Asia
2019 in Emirati sport